Mengdong(Va:Gaeng Dum) is a town of Cangyuan Va Autonomous County and the government seat of the county. Guangyun Temple was built in 1828, which is one of the major historical and cultural sites of China. Mengdong is also a land port of China which connects to Wa State of Myanmar.

Friendly towns
Tai'an, Miaoli, Taiwan

References

China–Myanmar border
Divisions of Cangyuan Va Autonomous County